is a 1934 black-and-white Japanese film directed by Kenji Mizoguchi. It is a lost film.

Cast 
 Isuzu Yamada
 Denmei Suzuki
 Komako Hara

Release 
Originally released in Japan on 1 September 1934.

References

External links
 

1934 films
1930s Japanese-language films
Japanese black-and-white films
Films directed by Kenji Mizoguchi
Nikkatsu films
Lost Japanese films